Camila Comin (born 31 March 1983) is a Brazilian acrobat, and was a artistic gymnast, representing her nation at international competitions.

She participated at the 2004 Summer Olympics. 
She also participated at world championships, including the 2006 World Artistic Gymnastics Championships in Aarhus, Denmark.

References

External links
Camila Comin at Sports Reference
http://espnw.espn.uol.com.br/camila-comin-31-anos-paulista/
http://www.gazetadopovo.com.br/esportes/poliesportiva/agora-artista-camila-comin-volta-para-casa-49aujkvchs0ifeitb23gzthzi
http://globoesporte.globo.com/ginastica-artistica/noticia/2014/02/ex-ginasta-camila-comin-mostra-incrivel-flexibilidade-no-cirque-du-soleil.html
https://www.youtube.com/watch?v=WnorPVAgXxA

1983 births
Living people
Brazilian female artistic gymnasts
Place of birth missing (living people)
Gymnasts at the 2000 Summer Olympics
Gymnasts at the 2004 Summer Olympics
Olympic gymnasts of Brazil
Gymnasts at the 1999 Pan American Games
Gymnasts at the 2003 Pan American Games
Pan American Games bronze medalists for Brazil
Pan American Games medalists in gymnastics
South American Games gold medalists for Brazil
South American Games medalists in gymnastics
Competitors at the 1998 South American Games
Competitors at the 2002 South American Games
Medalists at the 1999 Pan American Games
Medalists at the 2003 Pan American Games